Oatten Fisher (April 1, 1924 – April 30, 2006), was an all-star Canadian Football League player.

Having played college football at the University of North Carolina, Fisher embarked on an 8-year career in Canada. While he only played 16 games over 2 seasons with the Toronto Argonauts, he had a successful stint with the Toronto Balmy Beach Beachers of the Ontario Rugby Football Union, where he was selected an all-star 3 times. He finished his football career in 1959 with the Calgary Stampeders.

Fisher was among the first African-American players to break the colour barrier in the CFL. He died in Toronto on April 30, 2006.

References

External links
 Oatten Fisher statistics at CFLapedia

1924 births
2006 deaths
People from Salisbury, North Carolina
African-American players of Canadian football
Canadian football offensive linemen
Toronto Argonauts players
Calgary Stampeders players
Ontario Rugby Football Union players
North Carolina Tar Heels football players
Toronto Balmy Beach Beachers players
Players of American football from North Carolina
20th-century African-American sportspeople
21st-century African-American people